Butler Ives (January 31, 1830, in Berkshire County, Massachusetts – December 1872 near Vallejo, California), son of Butler Ives Sr. and Olive Hall Morse Sheffield, was the youngest of ten children and was educated at the University of Michigan. He is buried in Elmwood Cemetery, Detroit, Michigan.

His greatest work consisted of pioneer engineering, surveying and locating the line of the Union Pacific and Central Pacific railroads between San Francisco and Salt Lake City, working under Leland Stanford and Samuel S. Montague, chief engineer. He was contracted to locate and survey the boundary line between the Nevada Territory and the State of California—running south and southeast from Oregon.

In 1863, Ives worked with J. F. Houghton to survey the California-Nevada border. The survey was never completed, but the partial delineation was known as the Houghton-Ives line.

The Ives papers in general, dating back to 1754, together with the old family bible are deposited for safekeeping with the Clarence Burton Historical Society in Detroit, Michigan.

References

1830 births
1872 deaths
American surveyors
University of Michigan alumni
People from Vallejo, California
Burials at Elmwood Cemetery (Detroit)